The 1997 Mongolian National Championship was the thirtieth recorded edition of top flight football in Mongolia and the second season of the Mongolian Premier League, which took over as the highest level of competition in the country from the previous Mongolian National Championship. Delger, (Wide) from Delger in the sum (district) of Govi-Altai Province in western Mongolia were champions, with Erchim (the team representing Ulaanbaatar power plant) finishing as runners up, and ITR Bank in third place.

Format
The competition was played in two stages: firstly a double round robin league competition where each team played the others twice on a home and away basis. Following this, four teams qualified for two-legged semi-final playoffs, the winners of which advanced to a one off final, with the losers contesting a third place match.

Results

League table

Results table

Playoffs
The top three teams from the league stage qualified for the playoff rounds. In addition, they were joined by a fourth team known as HET. It is not clear how they became involved at this stage from the sources available. It does not seem that HET is analogous with Hurmastyn Ezed, since these sources also provide a record of this season's cup competition which features competing teams of both names.

Semi-finals

Third-place

Final

References

Mongolia Premier League seasons
Mongolia
Mongolia
football